is a puzzle video game released in 1991 by Compile for the MSX2. Since its creation, it uses characters from Madō Monogatari. It was created by Masamitsu "Moo" Niitani, the founder of Compile, who was inspired by certain elements from the Tetris and Dr. Mario series of games.

The game was released by Tokuma Shoten on the same day of the MSX2 release under the name  and as part of the Famimaga Disk series for the Family Computer Disk System. A year after the MSX2 and FDS versions, Sega released an arcade version, which heavily expanded the previous versions by including a one-player story mode and a two-player competitive mode.

Gameplay

The main game of Puyo Puyo is played against at least one opponent, computer or human. The game itself has three modes, Single Puyo Puyo, Double Puyo Puyo, and Endless Puyo Puyo. In Single mode, the player takes on the role of Arle Nadja, a 16-year-old female spellcaster that has the pleasure of foiling the Dark Prince's plans. The Dark Prince wishes to take over the world, and Arle stands in his way. As such, Arle must first however battle her way through 12 opponents before facing the Dark Prince. With the exception of Rulue, they are not sent by the Dark Prince, and mostly they just want to pull shenanigans with her (for Rulue, she fell in love with the Dark Prince). Once Arle has beaten the Dark Prince, the world is saved, so she can return home. As in all main Puyo games, the story mode consists of playing Puyo matches against a fixed sequence of characters in one of three courses. In Double mode, two players play against each other. In exactly the same fashion as before, by out-chaining one another, the player tries to fill up their opponent's grid. Since the rules of sending so many garbage blocks made games short-lived, no matter how many chains are sent, Compile added the rule of Offsetting in Puyo Puyo 2 and onwards. This lets players counter opponents' attacks with chains of their own, sending any garbage blocks back to them as a result of overflow. In endless mode, the player must continually match puyos to get the highest score they can. In Mission mode, the player must complete 52 missions requiring the Puyos on the field to be eliminated by using limited pieces.

Development
An English-translated version of the arcade original was created and released internationally which replaces the original voice work, changes many of the characters' names, and removes the wings of the Harpies (which are called Dark Elves in the English version). Sega had re-released Puyo Puyo for the Mega Drive on December 18, 1992 and the Game Gear on March 19, 1993 in Japan. The Game Gear port of Puyo Puyo contains an English version named Puzlow Kids; this version appears whenever the game cartridge is used in a North American or European system. A PC-9801 port was released by Compile on March 19, 1993, the same day the Game Gear port was released. Tokuma Shoten had re-released their version Puyo Puyo for the Family Computer itself on July 23, 1993, which added a 2-player competitive mode. Banpresto released a version for the Super Famicom under the title  on December 10, 1993. A port to the Game Boy was developed by Winkysoft, published by Banpresto and released on July 31, 1994 under the original name. NEC Avenue released their version of Puyo Puyo for the PC Engine's CD-ROM² on April 22, 1994 titled . CRI Middleware released their version of Puyo Puyo for the FM Towns in December 1994. The game was ported to Amiga by request of Amiga Power magazine and was featured on a cover disk under the name Super Foul Egg. It was then ported to RISC OS on Acorn by Owain Cole (and featured on an Acorn User cover disk), and finally ported to Java. In late 1995 it was ported to the Apple IIGS by Bret Victor. 

Before the series was branded as Puyo Pop internationally, the Genesis version of the first game saw release outside Japan in 1993 as Dr. Robotnik's Mean Bean Machine in North America and Europe; this version omitted the characters and setting of the original release, replacing them with characters from the Adventures of Sonic the Hedgehog animated series. The Game Gear version was likewise altered for North America and Europe, and also ported to the Master System in Europe. Two years later, the game was released for the Super NES as Kirby's Avalanche in North America and as 'Kirby's Ghost Trap in Europe, utilizing characters from Nintendo's Kirby series.

 Reception 

In Japan, Game Machine listed the arcade version of Puyo Puyo'' on their December 15, 1992 issue as being the fifth most-successful table arcade unit of the month.

The Mega Drive version was a bestseller in Japan for four months.

Legacy 
The Mega Drive version was re-released for the Wii's Virtual Console in Japan on December 2, 2006, while the arcade version was released on April 12, 2011. The arcade VC release features online play.

On August 22, 2019, the Arcade version was re-released for the Nintendo Switch under the  brand, with online-playing features.

References

External links

Hardcore Gaming 101 - Puyo Puyo Details the entirety of the series and all of its spinoffs

1991 video games
Arcade video games
Compile (company) games
Famicom Disk System games
FM Towns games
Game Boy games
Game Gear games
Lavastorm games
Mobile games
MSX2 games
Multiplayer and single-player video games
N-Gage games
NEC PC-9801 games
Nintendo Entertainment System games
Nintendo Switch Online games
Puyo Puyo
Sega Genesis games
X68000 games
Super Nintendo Entertainment System games
Tokuma Shoten games
TurboGrafx-CD games
Video games developed in Japan
Video games scored by Toshiaki Sakoda
Virtual Console games
Winkysoft games
CRI Middleware games
ja:ぷよぷよ#旧世代ぷよぷよ（旧ぷよ）